The Agra–Bhopal section is a railway line connecting the 16–17th century capital of the Mughals,  Agra and Bhopal, capital of the Indian state of Madhya Pradesh. This  track is part of the Delhi–Chennai line. The line is under the jurisdiction of North Central Railway and West Central Railway.

History
The Agra–Gwalior line was opened by the Maharaja of Gwalior in 1881 and it became the Scindia State Railway.  The Indian Midland Railway built the Gwalior–Jhansi line and the Jhansi–Bhopal line in 1889. The Agra–Gwalior–Jhansi–Bhopal line became part of the Delhi–Chennai line in 1929.

The Jhansi–Kanpur line was constructed by the Indian Midland Railway in 1889.

The Gwalior–Bhind line was opened as a -wide narrow-gauge line in 1899. It was converted to broad gauge in 2001.

The Gwalior–Sheopur Kalan -wide narrow-gauge line was constructed between 1904 and 1909.

Electrification
The Agra–Gwalior sector was electrified in 1984–85, the Gwalior–Babina sector in 1986–87, Babina–Bareth sector in 1987–88, and Bareth-Bhopal sector in 1988–89. The Jhansi–Kanpur branch line was recently electrified in 2013 and has become operational with electric locomotives.

Speed limits
The Delhi–Chennai Central line (Grand Trunk route) is classified as a "Group A" line which can take speeds up to 160 km/h. For the BG branch lines speed limit is generally 100 km/h.

Bhopal Shatabdi Express, the fastest train in India, powered by a WAP-5 loco, travels along this line. 
The Chennai Rajdhani Express, which runs at an average speed (including halts)  of 77.23 km/h. uses this line.

Passenger movement
Agra Cantt., Gwalior, Jhansi and Bhopal  are amongst the top hundred booking stations of Indian Railway.

Loco sheds
Jhansi diesel loco shed holds 125+ locos including WDM-2, WDM-3A, WDM-3D, WDG-3A, WDS-6, WDG-4. Jhansi electric loco shed holds 180+ locos including WAG-5HA / WAG5HB, WAG-7. Gwalior NG diesel loco shed houses NDM-5 locos and carries out periodic overhaul. Dhaulpur NG diesel loco shed holds ZDM-3 locomotives used for Dhaulpur – Tantpur / Sirmuttra section. Agra diesel loco shop houses WDS-4, WDM-2S locos. The shed caters to the loco requirement for shunting at major NCR stations and the Jhansi Workshop.

Workshops
Jhansi has the largest workshop in Indian Railways for periodic overhaul of freight wagons. Broad gauge coach Workshop at Bhopal handles rebuilding and overhaul of old passenger coaches. Gwalior Coaching Workshop handles narrow-gauge coaches.

References

External links
 Trains at Agra Cantt.
 Trains at Gwallior
 Trains at Jhansi
 Trains at Bhopal

5 ft 6 in gauge railways in India
Railway lines in Uttar Pradesh
Rail transport in Rajasthan
Rail transport in Madhya Pradesh
Railway lines opened in 1889
Transport in Agra
Transport in Bhopal